Helsinge is the municipal seat of Gribskov Municipality in Region Hovedstaden on Zealand in Denmark. As of 1 January 2022, it has a population of 8,616.

History 
In early 19th century Helsinge was as small as the nearby villages, but it had an inn and a church and the vicar had another parish under him, Valby. Through the 19th century Helsinge grew. In 1840 23% of the 1258 inhabitants in the parish lived in the city, but in 1901 the percentage was 43% of 1647. In the meantime the town had got among other things both a judge (1848), a doctor (1859), a post office (1863), telegraphy (1872) and a railway station (1897).

Notable people 

 Christiern Pedersen (c.1480 – 1554 in Helsinge) a canon, humanist scholar, writer, printer and publisher 
 Jens Poul Andersen (1844 in Huseby, near Annisse – 1935) an inventor, constructed cameras
 Niels Fennet (born 1944 in Valby, near Helsinge) an engineer and businessman, founded Cabinn Hotels
 Thor Pedersen (born 1945) politician, member of Helsinge Municipal Council 1974-1986, Mayor 1978-1986, member of Folketinget & Government Minister. 
 Bente Hammer (born 1950) a textile artist and fashion designer, moved to Bornholm in 1987
 Anders Bircow (born 1951) a Danish actor and comedian 
 Yuko Takada Keller (born 1958) an artist, curator and essayist based in Helsinge since 1997
 Christian Brøns (born 1977 in Kagerup, near Helsinge) a Danish singer

Sport 

 Rolf Sørensen (born 1965) a former Danish professional road bicycle racer, silver medallist at the 1996 Summer Olympics, now a cycling commentator and agent
 Poul-Erik Høyer Larsen (born 1965) a retired Danish badminton player and President of the Badminton World Federation
 Morten Petersen (born 1978) a Danish retired footballer, over 200 caps for Lyngby Boldklub
 Nikolaj Markussen (born 1988) a Danish handballer who plays for Bjerringbro-Silkeborg
 Sandra Toft (born 1989) a Danish handball goalkeeper

International relations

Twin towns — Sister cities
Helsinge is twinned with:

  Lubsko, Poland

Sources

 Ethelberg, Hans. En landsby i vækst. Helsinge Lokalhistoriske Arkiv, 2001. 

Municipal seats in the Capital Region of Denmark
Municipal seats of Denmark
Cities and towns in the Capital Region of Denmark
Gribskov Municipality